Tobias Mattsson (born 9 March 1991) is a Swedish footballer who plays for Trelleborgs FF as a forward.

References

External links

1991 births
Living people
Association football forwards
Trelleborgs FF players
Allsvenskan players
Superettan players
Swedish footballers